The XCBusa is a paragliding competition in the northern alps in Italy by the lake Garda.

History 
The Contest its born in Riva del Garda Italy made by the italian Pilot Michele Marchi Vidi

Rules 
The pilots has 5 try to make a flight for the final score. The flight has to be declared before taking off. The best 3 flight will be taken for the final score using the xcontest scoring system.

XCBusa 2014

Results 

1 -  Italo Miori

2 -  Roberto La Fauci

3 -  Moreno Parmesan

XCBusa 2015

Results 
1 -  Moreno Parmesan

2 -  Italo Miori

3 -  Giorgio Tonetta

XCBusa 2016

Results 
1 -   Moreno Parmesan

2 -   Matteo Marega

3 -   Ermanno Dossi

XCBusa 2017

Results 
1 -   Helmut Schrempf

2 -   Manuel Schmiedhofer

3 -   Italo Miori

XCBusa 2018

Results 
1 -   Piero Franchini

2 -  Italo Miori

3 -  Stefano Sottroi

XCBusa 2019

Results 
1 -   Andrea Conci

2 -  Giovanni Gallizzia

3 -  Ivan Centa

References

External links 

 XCBUSA

Adventure racing
Paragliding
X-Alps